The 2017–18 All-Ireland Senior Club Hurling Championship was the 48th staging of the All-Ireland Senior Club Hurling Championship, the Gaelic Athletic Association's premier inter-county club hurling tournament. The championship began on 8 October 2017 and ended on 24 March 2018.

Cuala of Dublin were the defending champions. Liam Mellows of Galway and Dicksboro of Kilkenny returned to the championship after long absences.

On 24 March 2018, Cuala won the championship following a 2-17 to 1-17 defeat of Na Piarsaigh in a replay of the All-Ireland final. This was their second successive All-Ireland title.

Cuala's David Treacy was the championship's top scorer with 0-44.

Format

County Championships

Ireland's counties play their county championships between their senior hurling clubs. Each county decides the format for determining their county champions. The format can be knockout, double-elimination, league, etc or a combination.

Only single club teams are allowed to enter the All-Ireland Club championship. If a team which is an amalgamation of two or more clubs or a university team wins a county's championship, a club team will represent that county in the provincial championship as determined by that county's championship rules (normally it is the club team that exited the championship at the highest stage).

Provincial Championships

Leinster, Munster and Ulster organise a provincial championship for their participating county champions. Connacht discontinued their senior club championship after 2007. They do organise intermediate and junior championships and are represented in the All-Ireland senior club semi-finals by the Galway champions. Some counties enter their senior clubs in the All-Ireland intermediate club championship (tier 2) as it is recognised that club hurling is weak in those counties.

All matches are knock-out. Two ten minute periods of extra time are played each way if it's a draw at the end of normal time.

All-Ireland

The two semi-finals are usually played on a Saturday in early February. The All-Ireland final is traditionally played in Croke Park on St. Patrick's Day, the 17th of March.

All matches are knock-out. If it's a draw at the end of normal time in the semi-finals or final, two ten minute periods of extra time are played each way. If the score is still level at the end of extra time the match is replayed.

Initial Schedule

County championships April 2017 to November 2017
Provincial championships October 2017 to December 2017
All-Ireland semi-finals early February 2018
All-Ireland final 17 March 2018

Team Summaries

County Finals

Leinster County Finals

Carlow SHC

Dublin SHC

Kilkenny SHC

Laois SHC

Offaly SHC

Westmeath SHC

Wexford SHC

Munster County Finals

Clare SHC

Cork SHC

 As Imokilly are an amalgamation team, Blackrock proceed to the Munster Club Championship

Limerick SHC

Tipperary SHC

Waterford SHC

Ulster County Finals

Antrim SHC

Derry SHC

Down SHC

Galway County Final

Galway SHC

Provincial championships

Leinster Senior Club Hurling Championship

Leinster Quarter-finals

Leinster Semi-finals

Leinster Final

Munster Senior Club Hurling Championship

Munster Quarter-final

Munster Semi-finals

Munster Final

Ulster Senior Club Hurling Championship

Ulster Semi-finals

Ulster Final

All-Ireland Senior Club Hurling Championship

All-Ireland Semi-finals

All-Ireland final

All-Ireland Final Replay

Top scorers

Overall

Single game

References

2017 in hurling
2018 in hurling
All-Ireland Senior Club Hurling Championship